E.H.P. (Établissements Henry Precloux) was a French automobile manufacturer.

History
The Établissements Henry Precloux commenced building light cars in Courbevoie (Paris) in 1921. In 1926 they incorporated Automobiles Bignan. In 1929 production was halted. A company called Loryc also license-built E.H.P. cars in Spain.

Cars
E.H.P. focused on small and lightweight automobiles. Originally they used a Ruby 903 cc four-cylinder, later engines from other manufacturers of up to 1.5 liters were installed. After the Bignan takeover, their 8CV cars were also offered as E.H.P.s. The 8CV was originally fitted with a 1,202 cc and  CIME engine, later a 20 PS and a 29 PS "Grand Sport" version were added. In 1928 the DU model appeared, fitted with an inline-six of 1,300 cc.

Competition
The E.H.P. automobiles also saw much competition, participating in four 24 Hours of Le Mans races, coming in second in the 1928 "Index of Thermal Efficiency".

Le Mans record

References

Car manufacturers of France
Vehicle manufacturing companies established in 1921
Vehicle manufacturing companies disestablished in 1929
Defunct motor vehicle manufacturers of France
24 Hours of Le Mans race cars
French companies established in 1921
1929 disestablishments in France